Below are the squads for the 2015 South Asian Football Federation Cup, hosted by India, which will take place between 23 December 2015
and 3 January 2016. The player's total caps, their club teams and age are as of 23 December 2015 – the tournament's opening day.

Group A

India 
Coach:  Stephen Constantine

Nepal
Coach:  Patrick Aussems

Sri Lanka 
Coach: Sampath Perera

Group B

Coach:  Ricki Herbert

Coach:  Petar Segrt

|-
! colspan="7" style="background:#b0d3fb; text-align:left;"|
|- style="background:#dfedfd;"

|-
! colspan="7" style="background:#b0d3fb; text-align:left;"|
|- style="background:#dfedfd;"

|-
! colspan="7" style="background:#b0d3fb; text-align:left;"|
|- style="background:#dfedfd;"

Coach: Maruful Haque

|-
! colspan="9"  style="background:#b0d3fb; text-align:left;"|
|- style="background:#dfedfd;"

|-
! colspan="9"  style="background:#b0d3fb; text-align:left;"|
|- style="background:#dfedfd;"

 

|-
! colspan="9"  style="background:#b0d3fb; text-align:left;"|
|- style="background:#dfedfd;"

Coach: Pema Dorji

References

2015 SAFF Championship
SAFF Championship squads